Francisco José Ynduráin Muñoz (23 December 1940 – 6 June 2008) was a Spanish theoretical physicist. He founded the particle physics research group that became the Department of Theoretical Physics at the Autonomous University of Madrid, where he was a Professor. He was described by his colleagues as "a scientist that always searched for excellence in research".

Early life
Yndurain was born in Benavente (Zamora) and grew up in Saragossa. After graduating from Saragossa's San Agustin High school, he received his M.S. degree in mathematics in 1962 and in 1964 his PhD in physics. He obtained both degrees from the University of Zaragoza (Spain).

While completing his doctoral studies, he was a visiting scientist at CERN and a Teaching Assistant at the University of Zaragoza (Spain).

Career
Ynduráin was an associate professor at the University of Zaragoza until 1966. He was a researcher at New York University from 1966 to 1968, at which point he moved to Geneva to become a research fellow at CERN until 1970. He was a Researcher at CERN from then on, as a Senior Scientific Associate (1976–1992), and as a member of the Scientific Policy committee (1988–1994).

In 1970 he took the professor position in Madrid (at the Complutense University and immediately after at the Autonomous University of Madrid) where he founded and headed the Particle Physics Research group. He was Director of the Department of Theoretical Physics (1974–1977 and 1981–1984), Dean of the Faculty of Science (1975) and Deputy President (1978–1981) of the Autonomous University of Madrid.

He also held other short-term appointments at other universities worldwide:
 Central University of Venezuela in Caracas, Venezuela (1967).
 Paris-Sud 11 University, Paris, France (1969 and 1970).
 University of Groningen, Netherlands (1973).
 Université de Marseille, Marseille, France (1979, 1980, 1981 and 1982)
 University of Michigan, Ann Arbor, Michigan, USA (1987, 1988, 1991, 1993, 1994, 1995, 1997 and 2001).
 National University of La Plata, Argentina (1994).
 Princeton University, New Jersey, USA (2008).

He collaborated with other research centers:
 Brookhaven National Laboratory (1984).
 National Institute for Nuclear Physics and High Energy Physics NIKHEF, 1997 and 2001).
 Kuwait Institute for Scientific Research (1980 and 1982).
 Centro lationamericano de Física in Bogotá, Colombia (1985, 1986 and 1987).

He was a member of the Royal Spanish Physical Society, Royal Academy of Exact Physical and Natural Sciences of Spain, where he was president of the Physics and Chemistry section from 2002 to 2006. He was also member of the American Physical Society, founding member of the European Physical Society and member of the European Academy of Sciences energy committee. In 2004 he was nominated general secretary of the Instituto de España.

Works
In 1983, Yndurain published a widely used book advanced textbook on quantum field theory for graduate students, Quantum Chromodynamics: An Introduction to the Theory of Quarks and Gluons. The book has been translated into Russian as Kvantovaia Khromodinamika. The book was expanded twice: once in 1996 as Relativistic Quantum Mechanics and Introduction to Field Theory, and again in 1999 as The Theory of Quark and Gluon Interactions.

Yndurain also wrote books on science for a broader audience. In 1997 he published a book discussing UFOs theories, Quién anda ahí?, which won the Golondriz award for smart humor in 1998. In 2002 he published a book about the structure of matter entitled Electrones, neutrinos y quarks. Finally, in 2004 he published a book about science, scientists and history entitled Los desafíos de la ciencia.

Awards
 1986: Nominated Cavaliere Ufficiale nell’Ordine al Merito, one of the main Italian orders of merit.
 1990: Annual Award of the Royal Spanish Academy of Sciences.
 1992: Elected Member of the Spanish Royal Academy of Exact, Physical and Natural Sciences.
 1994: Nominated Distinguished Guest by the University of La Plata
 1995: Elected member of European Academy of Sciences and Arts
 2001: Nominated member of The World Innovation Foundation.
 2003: Gold medal for scientific excellence of the Spanish Academy of Physics.

Selected articles 
Yndurain was an expert in quantum field theory and its application to elementary particles. He authored or co-authored more than 100 scientific papers on high energy physics, nuclear physics and mathematical physics.

 
 
 
 
 
 
 
 
 
 
 
 
  Erratum-ibid.B122:486,1983.

References

External links
Scientific publications of Francisco José Ynduráin on INSPIRE-HEP

1940 births
2008 deaths
Particle physicists
People associated with CERN
Spanish physicists
Spanish science writers
Academic staff of Paris-Sud University
Princeton University faculty
University of Michigan faculty
Academic staff of the Autonomous University of Madrid
University of Zaragoza alumni
Academic staff of the University of Zaragoza
New York University faculty
Theoretical physicists